This is a list of retail chains in Slovenia.

Grocery stores

Drugstores 

Former:
Watsons

Home renovation / DIY / Furniture 

Former:

bauMax
M Pohištvo

Kids / toy stores

Clothing stores

Footwear stores

Sportswear & other sport equipment

Sport equipment stores 
 Decathlon

Bags & other fashion accessories

Jewellery, goldsmith & watch stores

Electronics stores 
 Harvey Norman

Bookstores 
 Müller

Gift shops 
 Kik
 NKD

Retail
Slovenia